Gabriel Ramos Millan (1903-September 26, 1949) was a Mexican senator, lawyer and urban developer who was known locally as the "Apostle of Corn". As a politician, Ramos Millan was considered by many, including Mexican President Miguel Aleman, as a strong candidate for Mexico's presidency. Aleman and Ramos Millan had a personal friendship.

Ramos Millan was born in Apayango, Mexico, a town that later honored him by changing its name officially to Apayango de Gabriel Ramos Millan.

Ramos Millan's niece, Angela Diaz Millan is living at age 112.

In Mexico, Ramos Millan created the National Commission of Corn.

Death
On September 26, 1949, Ramos Millan and 22 others, including actress Blanca Estela Pavon, were killed when their Mexicana de Aviacion Douglas DC-3 airplane crashed onto the Popocateptl volcano in an accident that killed everyone on board during the Tapachula to Mexico City leg of a Tuxtla Gutierrez to Mexico City flight.

Honors
Including the renaming of his town, Ramos Millan has been honored in his native country, including naming an elementary school after him in Sinaloa.

External links

1903 births
1949 deaths
20th-century Mexican lawyers
Members of the Senate of the Republic (Mexico)
Victims of aviation accidents or incidents in Mexico